Colonel Charles James William Grant VC (14 October 1861 – 23 November 1932) was a Scottish recipient of the Victoria Cross, the highest and most prestigious award for gallantry in the face of the enemy that can be awarded to British and Commonwealth forces.

Details
Charles Grant was born in Bourtie, Aberdeenshire, Scotland. He attended the Royal Military College, Sandhurst, before being commissioned into the Suffolk Regiment on 10 May 1882. 

He was 29 years old, and a lieutenant in the Indian Staff Corps, Indian Army during the Anglo-Manipur War when the following deed took place for which he was awarded the VC. In March 1891, during a revolt in the eastern Indian State of Manipur, James Wallace Quinton, the resident Frank Grimwood and other British officers were murdered, while others were imprisoned. Lieutenant CJW Grant of the Madras Staff Corps with a detachment of eighty Punjabi and Gurkha soldiers was stationed at the border post of Tamu, some 55 miles from Manipur. On hearing about the incident on 28 March, he immediately marched with his detachment for relief of the survivors. On 31 March, he arrived at Thoubal about 15 miles from Imphal and immediately attacked and captured the village. He then proceeded to entrench his force. Next day, the Manipuris advanced towards Thoubal in force. Without waiting for the enemy to attack, Lieutenant Grant with forty men went out to meet them and forming up, opened fire. For the next nine days, the intrepid young officer and his gallant men repulsed repeated attacks. Always keeping the initiative, and surprising the Manipuris with sallies, he inflicted heavy casualties and thoroughly demoralized them. Several offers of truce and safe passage were spurned by him. On 9 April, he received orders to withdraw towards a British force, which was then advancing towards Manipur. Eighty men had defied the entire army of a state for more than a week, losing just one man killed and four wounded, including Lieutenant Grant. The lieutenant and his men joined the relieving force and took further part in fighting during which he was again wounded. The British entered Imphal (Kangla) on 26 April, bringing an end to the war. For his conspicuous bravery, inspirational leadership and devotion to duty, Lieutenant Charles Grant was awarded the Victoria Cross.

His citation in the London Gazette reads:

He later achieved the rank of brevet colonel and commanded the 89th and 92nd Punjabis (now 1st & 4th Battalions The Baloch Regiment, Pakistan Army). He retired in 1911 and returned to England. He rejoined the army during the First World War, acting as a draft conducting officer. He lived in Sidmouth, Devon, where he died in 1932, aged 71.

On 24 June 2021, it was reported that Grant's VC was sold at auction along with other historically important items to an unnamed bidder for £420,000.

Notes

See also
 List of Brigade of Gurkhas recipients of the Victoria Cross
 Ethel Grimwood

References
 Ahmad, Maj Rifat Nadeem, and Ahmed, Maj Gen Rafiuddin. (2006). Unfaded Glory: The 8th Punjab Regiment 1798–1956. Abbottabad: The Baloch Regimental Centre.
 
Monuments to Courage (David Harvey, 1999)
The Register of the Victoria Cross (This England, 1997)
Scotland's Forgotten Valour (Graham Ross, 1995)

External links
Location of grave and VC medal (Devonshire)

British recipients of the Victoria Cross
1861 births
1932 deaths
People from Aberdeenshire
Suffolk Regiment officers
Indian Staff Corps officers
Graduates of the Royal Military College, Sandhurst
Madras Staff Corps officers
British military personnel of the Third Anglo-Burmese War
Indian Army personnel of World War I